Joanne Jishung Liu (born April 10, 1965 in Taipei, Taiwan) is a professional poker player from Palo Alto, California. She was in 2007 the highest placing female in a World Poker Tour Championship event, finishing runner-up to Ted Forrest at the WPT Bay 101 Shooting Stars.

As of 2019, her total live tournament winnings exceed $3,200,000. She ranks 7th in live tournament earnings among female players, behind Vanessa Selbst, Kathy Liebert, Annie Duke, Annette Obrestad, Liv Boeree and Vanessa Rousso.

Liu was born in Taiwan, and moved to Peoria, Illinois to pursue a master's degree in computer engineering at Bradley University. After graduation, she took a job as a software engineer in Silicon Valley. It was there that she discovered her love for poker, having never played it until she came to the United States.

References

External links
 Palo Alto Daily News article

Female poker players
Living people
American poker players
1965 births
American people of Taiwanese descent
Bradley University alumni
People from Palo Alto, California
Sportspeople from Taipei
American people of Chinese descent